This Is My House is a British game show created by Richard Bacon and Nick Weidenfeld, which first aired on BBC One on 24 March 2021. The first series was presented by Stacey Dooley.

Each episode sees four contestants (the homeowner and three imposters) attempting to convince a panel of celebrities that they are the real owner of a house.

For Red Nose Day 2022, Ricky Hatton, Claire Richards, Deborah Meaden, and Robert Rinder took part in a one-off celebrity special.

Critical reception 

In a review in The Guardian, Lucy Mangan awarded the opening episode five stars out of five, calling it "all the best bits of Big Brother, Through the Keyhole and Would I Lie to You?, with a large dash of subjective Guess Who? thrown in."

International versions 

An Italian version, Questa è casa mia!, aired on Real Time in 2022.

References

External links
 
 
 

2021 British television series debuts
2020s British game shows
BBC television game shows
English-language television shows